The following is a list of all IFT-licensed over-the-air television stations broadcasting in the Mexican state of Hidalgo. There are 12 television stations in Hidalgo.

Televisa network service (Las Estrellas and Canal 5) for Pachuca is supplied by retransmitters of XEX and XHTM at Altzomoni, State of Mexico.

List of television stations

|-

|-

|-

|-

|-

|-

|-

|-

|-

|-

|-

|-

|-

References

Television stations in Hidalgo
Hidalgo